The Sportske novosti Yellow Shirt award or SN Yellow Shirt for short is an annual football award given by the Croatian sports daily Sportske novosti. It is awarded to the best football player playing in the Croatian First League at the end of every season, based on post-match ratings awarded by sports journalists over the course of a season.

Established in 1953, the award was originally sponsored by the defunct Zagreb-based sports newspaper Narodni sport and its sports weekly Sportska panorama, and was awarded to the Player of the Season in the Yugoslav First League. In February 1962 Narodni sport was acquired by the Vjesnik publishing company and renamed Sportske novosti (SN). Since 1991 and the breakup of Yugoslavia, the paper gives the award to the best players in the Prva HNL, Croatia's top flight.

As of 2010 only three players have won the award on more than occasion, with each of them winning two awards: 
Vladica Kovačević (1963, 1965)
Rudolf Belin (1964, 1969)
Jurica Jerković (1971, 1976)
Igor Cvitanović (1996, 1997)
Ivica Olić (2002, 2003) 
Eduardo (2006, 2007)

Winners

Yugoslav league

Croatian league

Source: Nogometni-magazin.com

Notes on club name changes:
Dinamo Zagreb changed their name to "HAŠK Građanski" in June 1991 and then again in February 1993 to "Croatia Zagreb". They reverted to "Dinamo Zagreb" in February 2000.
While the original NK Varaždin (1931–2015), known as NK Varteks from 1958 until June 2010, no longer exists, two new teams, both unassociated with the earlier club, have been founded in the city of Varaždin: NK Varteks, founded 2011; and NK Varaždin, called Varaždin ŠN when founded in 2012, when it overlapped with the original club.

Other awards
Football Oscar, given by the Croatian union Football syndicate, chosen by players and managers of league clubs.
Prva HNL Player of the Year (Tportal), given by the Croatian website Tportal, chosen by captains of league clubs.
Croatian Footballer of the Year, given by the Croatian newspaper Večernji list, chosen by sport journalists.

Croatian football trophies and awards
Awards established in 1992
1953 establishments in Croatia
Annual events in Croatia